Starksia galapagensis, the Galapagos blenny, is a species of labrisomid blenny endemic to the Galapagos Islands. This species can reach a length of  TL.

References

galapagensis
Fish described in 1971
Taxa named by Richard Heinrich Rosenblatt